A gaming control board (GCB), also called by various names including gambling control board, casino control board, gambling board, and gaming commission, is a government agency charged with regulating casino and other types of gaming in a defined geographical area, usually a state, and of enforcing gaming law in general.

Rules and regulations
Gaming control boards are usually responsible for promulgating rules and regulations that dictate how gaming activities are to be conducted within a jurisdiction. The rules and regulations stem from the jurisdiction's enabling act. Generally, the enabling act is passed by the legislature and sets forth the broad policy of the jurisdiction with regard to gaming; while the rules and regulations provide detailed requirements that must be satisfied by a gaming establishment, its owners, employees, and vendors. Typically, rules and regulations cover a broad range of activity, including licensing, accounting systems, rules of casino games, fair play, better security and auditing.

Licensing
Gaming control boards also have complete authority to grant or deny licenses to gaming establishments, their ownership, employees, and vendors. Generally, in order to obtain a license, an applicant must demonstrate that they possess good character, honesty and integrity. License application forms typically require detailed personal information. Based upon the type of license being sought, an applicant may also be required to disclose details regarding previous business relationships, employment history, criminal records, and financial stability.

Generally, the gaming license application process and subsequent investigation is quite burdensome in comparison to the process of obtaining other government-issued licenses. The difficulty of the process is intended to dissuade participation by unsavory people and organized crime.

Recently, in order to simplify the application process, various gaming control boards have collaborated on the design of "multi-jurisdictional" application forms. Persons or vendors who are involved in gaming in multiple jurisdictions may now complete one application form and submit copies to each jurisdiction.

Enforcement
In some cases, Gaming Control Boards are responsible for enforcing the rules and regulations that they create. In other cases, a separate body or a division of the Gaming Control Board carries out the enforcement function. Most Gaming Control Boards have full authority to hear and decide civil cases brought before them by the enforcement body and thus are considered quasi-judicial bodies.

Gaming control boards

Inter-regional associations 
 Gaming Regulators European Forum (GREF)
 International Association of Gaming Regulators (IAGR)
 North American Gaming Regulators Association (NAGRA)

Regional and tribal associations

Asia
 Macau: Macau Gaming Inspection and Coordination Bureau
 Singapore: Casino Regulatory Authority of Singapore

Europe
 Denmark: Spillemyndigheden
 France :  Autorité Nationale des Jeux 
 Gibraltar: Gibraltar Regulatory Authority
 Hungary: Gaming Board of Hungary
 Malta: Malta Gaming Authority
 Netherlands: Nederlandse Kansspelautoriteit
 Norway: Norwegian Gaming and Foundation Authority - part of Ministry of Culture
 Portugal: Inspectorate General on Gaming
 Slovenia: Office for Gaming Supervision - part of the Ministry of Finance
 Sweden: National Gaming Board
 United Kingdom: Gambling Commission
 Alderney: Alderney Gambling Control Commission
 Isle of Man: Isle of Man Gambling Supervision Commission

North America

Canada
In Canada, gambling is regulated exclusively by the provinces rather than federal law. But there is also the National Trade Association of Canada - The Canadian Gaming Association (CGA). This works to advance the development of Canada's gaming industry. The association’s mandate is to promote the economic value of games in Canada; Use research, innovation and best practices t. Regulatory agencies include:
 Alberta Gaming, Liquor, and Cannabis Commission
British Columbia Gaming Policy and Enforcement Branch
 Kahnawake Gaming Commission
 Nova Scotia Alcohol and Gaming Authority
 Alcohol and Gaming Commission of Ontario
 Quebec Régie des Alcools des Courses et des Jeux

United States
In the United States, gambling is legal under federal law, although there are significant restrictions pertaining to interstate and online gambling.

States
Individual states have the right to regulate or prohibit the practice within their borders. Regulatory agencies include:
 Arizona Department of Gaming
 California Gambling Control Commission
 California Bureau of Gambling Control
 Colorado Division of Gaming
 Connecticut Division of Special Revenue
 Delaware Lottery
 Delaware Division of Gaming Enforcement
 Illinois Gaming Board
 Indiana Gaming Commission
 Iowa Racing and Gaming Commission
 Kansas Racing and Gaming Commission
 Louisiana Gaming Control Board
 Maine Gambling Control Board
 Maryland Lottery (Controls both the lottery and the state's slot-machine program)
 Massachusetts Gaming Commission
 Michigan Gaming Control Board
 Mississippi Gaming Commission
 Missouri Gaming Commission
 Nevada Gaming Commission
 Nevada Gaming Control Board
 New Jersey Casino Control Commission
 New Jersey Division of Gaming Enforcement
 New Mexico Gaming Control Board
 New York State Gaming Commission
 Ohio Casino Control Commission
 Pennsylvania Gaming Control Board
 South Dakota Commission on Gaming
 Washington State Gambling Commission
 West Virginia Lottery Commission

Tribes
In the United States, some Native American tribal nations have established their own gaming control boards for the purpose of regulating tribe-owned casinos located within reservations. Although the tribal nation also owns the casino, appointing an independent gaming control board to oversee regulatory activities provides tribal members with assurances that the casino is operated within expected standards and that tribal revenue is accurately collected and reported. Native American casinos are subject to the provisions of the Indian Gaming Regulatory Act, which is enforced by the National Indian Gaming Commission (NIGC). The NIGC establishes minimum internal control standards and other requirements that each Native American gaming control board must follow. However, the NIGC does not have jurisdiction over state-regulated entities.

Oceania
 New South Wales, Australia: Gaming Tribunal of New South Wales
 Queensland, Australia: Queensland Office of Gaming Regulation/Queensland Gaming Commission
 Victoria (Australia): Victorian Commission for Gambling Regulation
 South Australia: South Australia Independent Gambling Authority

References 

 Government agencies by type